Siege of Vyborg may refer to:

 Siege of Vyborg (1706), an aborted Russian attempt to capture Vyborg, during the Great Northern War
 Siege of Vyborg (1710), a successful Russian attempt to capture Vyborg, during the Great Northern War